National Weather Service Louisville is a weather forecast office responsible for monitoring weather conditions for 49 counties in north-central, south-central, and east-central Kentucky and 10 counties in southern Indiana. The office is in charge of weather forecasts, warnings and local statements as well as aviation weather. It is also equipped with a WSR-88D (NEXRAD) radar, and an Automated Surface Observing System (ASOS) that greatly increase the ability to forecast. The NEXRAD radar site utilized by the forecast office is located near West Point, Kentucky on the north side of the Fort Knox Military Reservation.

NOAA Weather Radio 
 
The National Weather Service Forecast Office in Louisville, Kentucky provides programming for nine NOAA Weather Radio stations in the office's jurisdictions.

Weather Radio stations

References

External links
Louisville Office Main Page

 

Organizations based in Louisville, Kentucky
Louisville
Fort Knox
Buildings and structures in Hardin County, Kentucky